Panama competed at the 2020 Summer Olympics in Tokyo. Originally scheduled to take place from 24 July to 9 August 2020, the Games were postponed to 23 July to 8 August 2021, due to the COVID-19 pandemic. It was the nation's eighteenth appearance at the Summer Olympics, since its debut in 1928.

Competitors
The following is the list of competitors participating at the Games by numbers:

Athletics

Panamanian athletes achieved the entry standards, either by qualifying time or by world ranking, in the following track and field events (up to a maximum of 3 athletes in each event):

Track & road events

Field events

Boxing

Panama entered one female boxer into the Olympic tournament. With the cancellation of the 2021 Pan American Qualification Tournament in Buenos Aires, Argentina, Rio 2016 Olympian Atheyna Bylon finished among the top three of the women's middleweight category to secure her place in the Panamanian squad based on the IOC's Boxing Task Force Rankings for the Americas.

Cycling

Road
Panama entered one rider each to compete in the men's Olympic road race by finishing in the top two, not yet qualified, at the 2019 Pan American Championships in Mexico, marking the country's debut in the sport.

Judo

Panama qualified two judoka for each of the following weight classes at the Games. Representing Germany in two previous editions, Miryam Roper was selected among the top 18 judoka of the women's lightweight (57 kg) based on the IJF World Ranking List of June 28, 2021, while rookie Kristine Jiménez (women's half-heavyweight, 52 kg) accepted a continental berth from the Americas as the nation's top-ranked judoka outside of direct qualifying position.

Swimming

Panama received a universality invitation from FINA to send two top-ranked swimmers (one per gender) in their respective individual events to the Olympics, based on the FINA Points System and/or Olympic Selection Time (OST).

See also
Panama at the 2019 Pan American Games

References

Nations at the 2020 Summer Olympics
2020
2021 in Panamanian sport